Akiel Raffie (born 15 February 2003) is an Australian professional footballer who plays for Fleetwood Town, as a midfielder.

Career

Early life
Raffie was born in Sydney and raised in Camden, New South Wales to a South African father, Faghrie Deen, and Australian mother, Nicole Hogg. He attended Currans Hill Public School and trained with local side South West Wanderers. He first caught the eye of football scouts when he impressed in a World Football Group tour for under-9's in 2012, scoring two hat-tricks against Manchester United and Leeds United. Members of Preston North End travelled over to Sydney to watch him and Raffie was invited back to Preston to train with the club. The family moved over permanently to the UK in 2013 and he had spells with the Academies of Bolton Wanderers and Blackburn Rovers before joining Fleetwood Town in 2014 after a Lancashire youth tournament after a number of trials elsewhere. In 2018, he extended his youth scholarship with Fleetwood having also trained with the first team on a number of occasions and was also on the radar of Australia U17 coach, Trevor Morgan.

Professional
On 29 April 2021, he signed his first professional contract with the club, signing a deal until the end of the 2022–23 season, with the option of a further year in the clubs favour. He had impressed and been an integral part of the title-winning under-18 side in the previous season and even made his first team debut in October 2020 when he came off the bench for Gerard Garner in the 3–0 win over Aston Villa U21 in the EFL Trophy. 

On 29 October 2021, it was confirmed that he would join Northern Premier League Premier Division side Bamber Bridge on a short-term loan deal. The move came after he had made his second appearance for Fleetwood's first team at the start of October and he had been a constant feature in Stephen Crainey's Development Squad. On 29 November 2021, he returned to Fleetwood having completed his loan but did enough to impress Brig manager Jamie Milligan in his short time there making multiple appearances.

On 11 December 2021, he dropped down a division when he signed for Northern Premier League Division One West strugglers Kendal Town on a month's loan, as new Kendal chairman, Michael O'Neill, had strong ties with Fleetwood. He made his debut for the Mintcakes in the league clash away at Bootle.

On 25 January 2022, he was back in the NPL Premier Division when he signed for Nantwich Town on a season-long loan. On 15 February 2022, on his birthday, he managed to get a hat-trick of assists in a 5–1 win over Stalybridge Celtic away from home.

Personal life
He is the cousin of former New Zealand Rugby international Sonny Bill Williams. He has a younger brother Keyaan who played for the youth team at Manchester City.

Career statistics

References

External links

2003 births
Living people
Fleetwood Town F.C. players
Bamber Bridge F.C. players
Kendal Town F.C. players
Nantwich Town F.C. players
Northern Premier League players
Association football midfielders
Australian people of South African descent
Australian soccer players